"If You Leave Me, Can I Come Too?" is a song by Australian band Mental As Anything, released in May 1981 as the lead single from their third studio album Cats & Dogs. The song peaked at number 4 on the Kent Music Report.

At the 1981 Countdown Music Awards, the song won Best Australian Single.

Reception
Junkee Media described it as, "a gonzo anti-break-up song with a melody line as big and gaudy as one of Jeff Koons' flower dogs, is a cartoon in and of itself. It’s the kind of thing you'd expect to see scribbled on the side of a wall, rather than playing on the radio. And that's its genius."

Track listing

Personnel 
 Martin Plaza — lead vocals, guitar    
 Greedy Smith — lead vocals, keyboards, harmonica
 Reg Mombassa — guitar, vocals  
 Peter O'Doherty — bass, guitar, vocals 
 Wayne de Lisle – drums

Charts

Year-end charts

References 

Mental As Anything songs
1981 songs
1981 singles
Regular Records singles
Songs written by Martin Plaza